Diaethria is a brush-footed butterfly genus found in the Neotropical realm, ranging from Mexico to Paraguay.

Species in this genus are commonly called eighty-eights like the related genera Callicore and Perisama, in reference to the characteristic patterns on the hindwing undersides of many. In Diaethria, the pattern consists of black dots surrounded by concentric white and black lines, and typically looks like the numbers "88" or "89".

Species 
Listed alphabetically:
 Diaethria anna (Guérin-Méneville, [1844]) – Anna's eighty-eight
 Diaethria astala (Guérin-Méneville, [1844]) – faded eighty-eight, navy eighty-eight
 Diaethria bacchis (Doubleday, 1849)
 Diaethria candrena (Godart, [1824]) – candrena eighty-eight, number eighty
 Diaethria ceryx (Hewitson, 1864) – Ceryx eighty-eight
 Diaethria clymena (Cramer, 1775) – Cramer's eighty-eight
 Diaethria eluina (Hewitson, 1852) – eluina eighty-eight
 Diaethria euclides (Latreille, [1809])
 Diaethria gabaza (Hewitson, 1852)
 Diaethria neglecta (Salvin, 1869)
 Diaethria nystographa (Guenée, 1872)
 Diaethria pandama (Doubleday, [1848])

References

Lamas, G., ed. 2004. Atlas of Neotropical Lepidoptera. Checklist: Part 4A Hesperioidea-Papilionoidea. Gainesville: Scientific Publishers/Association of Tropical Lepidoptera.

External links 

TOL
Diaethria at Markku Savela's Lepidoptera and Some Other Life Forms

Biblidinae
Nymphalidae of South America
Nymphalidae genera
Taxa named by Gustaf Johan Billberg